{{Infobox religious biography|religion=Islam
| era = Islamic golden age
| name = Abū Bakr 'Abdollāh b. Moḥammad b. Šahāvar b. Anūšervān al-Rāzī
| title= Najm Al-Din Razi
| birth_date = 573/1177
| death_date = 654/1256
| Maddhab = Sufi
| school_tradition= Kubrawiyya
| ethnicity = Persian
| main_interests = Sufism
| influences = Najmeddin Kubra
|works = Mirsad Al-Ibad Men Mabda' Ela Al-Ma'ad
}}

Abū Bakr 'Abdollāh b. Moḥammad b. Šahāvar b. Anūšervān al-Rāzī commonly known by the laqab, or sobriquet, of Najm al-Dīn Dāya, meaning "wetnurse" (573 AH/1177 – 654 AH/1256) was a 13th-century Persian Sufi. Hamid Algar, translator of the Persian Merṣād to English, states the application of "wetnurse" to the author of the Merṣād derives from the idea of the initiate on the Path being a newborn infant who needs suckling to survive. Dāya followed the Sufi order, Kubrawiyya, established by one of his greatest influences, Najm al-Dīn Kubrā. Dāya traveled to Kārazm and soon became a morīd (pupil, one who follows the shaykh master and learns from him, undergoing spiritual training) of Najm al-Dīn Kubrā. Kubrā then appointed Shaikh Majd al-Dīn Bagdādī as the spiritual trainer who also became Dāya's biggest influence. Dāya constantly refers to al-Dīn Bagdādī as "our shaikh."

When his master, Najm al-Dīn Kubrā, was murdered in 618/1221, Dāya fled to Hamadan, then to Ardabil, and then to Anatolia where he finally settled with a fellow contemporary master Rumi.

There he put the teachings of his master Najmeddin Kubra into a writing in Persian called by the Arabic title Mirṣād al-ʻibād min al-mabdaʼ ilāʼl-maʻād (ِِArabic:  مرصاد العباد من المبدأ الی المعاد) which is shortly known as Merṣād al-ʻebād, and has gained prominence as a major reference text on Sufism and Islamic theology. The critical edition of Merṣād al-ʻebād by Mohammad-Amin Riahi was published in 1973 in Tehran and since then has been continued to be in print. This is a closely annotated scholarly edition, along with a comprehensive introduction on the life and works of Najmeddin Razi, which has been the major reference for later studies on Najmeddin Razi and Sufism. Merṣād al-ʻebād was translated by Hamid Algar into English as The Path of God's Bondsmen: From Origin to Return.Biography
Rāzi was born in Rey, then one of the major centers of urban life and culture in pre-Mongol Iran, in 1177. At the age of 26, Rāzī  travelled through Syria, Egypt, Ḥejāz, Iraq, and Azerbaijan. He finally settled in Khwārazm and soon become a murīd to Najm al-Dīn Kubrā, a mystical Sufi and founder of the Kubrawiya Order. Rāzī was then tutored by Shaikh Majd al-Dīn Baḡdādī, who Rāzī often refers to as "our shaikh". Rāzī then fled Khwārazm due to Kubrā’s prophecy of a Mongol invasion. Finally, Rāzī fled Rey as well, willingly abandoning his family to the Mongol invasion. Traveling via Hamadān, Erbīl, and Diyarbekir, he reached Kayseri in central Anatolia in Ramadān 618/October 1221. Thanks to Seljuq patronage, Anatolia was a center for the cultivation of Persian literature.

At Malatya, Razi met Shaikh Sehab al-Din Abu Hafs ‘Omar al-Sohravardi, nephew of the founder of the Sohravardi order. He completed the Merad at Sivas in August 1223.

The Path of God's Bondsmen: From Origin to Return
The term Merṣād refers to the path from Qur'anic verse 89:14; "Verily thy Lord watches over the path". The divine vigilance implied here is generally taken as referring to God's omniscience of men's deeds, but it is plain that Dāya takes it in a slightly different sense, that of a protective and guarding vigilance. The second part of the title, men al-mabda' elā' l-ma'ād ("from origin to return") is to be found in the titles of many works that purport to treat in comprehensive fashion both cosmogony and eschatology and all that lies between.

The comprehensiveness promised in this title of the work is amply fulfilled in its text. It deals, in a systematic manner, with the origins of the various realms and orders of creation, prophethood and the different dimensions of religion, the ritual practices, mores, and institutions of Sufism, the destinations that await different classes of men in the hereafter, and the fashion in which different professions and trades may come to yield spiritual benefit and heavenly reward.

A particular virtue of the book is its clear demonstration of the Qur'anic origins of Sufism. The numerous quotations from the Qur'an are not to be regarded as mere ornament, nor even as scriptural proofs adduced in support of various statements. Rather, they bear witness to the fact that for Dāya, as for other Sufis, the Qur'an constitutes a well-structured, seamless, and coherent universe. The Qur'anic verses encountered throughout the book are the loom on which it is woven, a particular sense for each verse being implied by the context in which it occurs.

Another prominent feature of the book is the frequency with which it draws parallels between the inner and the outer worlds, particularly with references to processes of growth and development i.e. seed, tree, branch, fruit; the emergence of the hen from the egg. Dāya says in his commentary of the Qur'an, "Verily all that God created in the world of form has its like in the world of meaning; all that He created in the world of meaning- this being the hereafter- has its true essence in the world of reality, which is the uttermost unseen. Know too that of all that God created in all the worlds, a specimen and sample is present in man." It follows, then, that inner and unseen processes may be accurately described in terms of their outer counterparts.
The literary importance of the Merṣād is considerable: it ranks among the masterpieces of Persian literature, and certain sections – particularly the narrative of the creation and appointment of Adam – bear comparison with the best prose written in Persian. Dāya's choice of illustrative verses- both those of his own composition and those of his predecessors -is judicious, and makes of his work an incidental anthology of Sufi poetry, particularly quatrains.The Merṣād was translated into Chinese by Wu Zixian in approximately 1660 and was taught in Chinese Muslim schools up until the early twentieth century.

Chapters
 First Part
 First Chapter: The Utility of Composing This Work
 Second Chapter: The Reason for Writing the Book
 Third Chapter: The Manner and Method the Book is Written
 Second Part
 First Chapter: The Creation of Spirits and the Degrees of Knowledge
 Second Chapter: The World Of Dominion
 Third Chapter: The Different Realms of Kingship and Dominion
 Fourth Chapter: The Creation of the Human Frame
 Fifth Chapter: The Attachment of the Spirit to the Frame
Third Part
 First Chapter: The Veils That Cover the Human Spirit
 Second Chapter: The Wise Purpose for Attachment of the Spirit to the Frame
 Third Chapter: The Need for Prophets
 Fourth Chapter: The Abrogation of Previous Religions
 Fifth Chapter: The Cultivation of the Human Frame
 Sixth Chapter: The Refinement of the Soul
 Seventh Chapter: The Purification of the Heart
 Eight Chapter: The Adornment of the Spirit
 Ninth Chapter: The Need for a Shaikh
 Tenth Chapter: The Conditions and Attributes of the Shaikh
 Eleventh Chapter: The Conditions, Attributes, and Customs of the Morīd
 Twelfth Chapter: The Need for Zekr
 Thirteenth Chapter: The Method of Zekr
 Fourteenth Chapter: The Transmission of Zekr
 Fifteenth Chapter: The Need for Seclusion
 Sixteenth Chapter: Visions Deriving from the Unseen
 Seventeenth Chapter: The Witnessing of Lights
 Eighteenth Chapter: Manifestation of the Divine Essence
 Twentieth Chapter: Attaining to the Divine Presence
 Fourth Part
 First Chapter: The Return of the Oppressive Soul
 Second Chapter: The Return of the Inspired Soul
 Third Chapter: The Return of the Foremost Soul
 Fourth Chapter: The Return of the Most Wretched Soul
 Fifth Part
 First Chapter: The Wayfaring of Kings
 Second Chapter: Kings and Their Conduct
 Third Chapter: The Wayfaring of Minister and Deputies
 Fourth Chapter: The Wayfaring of Different Classes of Scholar
 Fifth Chapter: The Wayfaring of the Holders of Wealth
 Sixth Chapter: The Wayfaring of Farmers
 Seventh Chapter: They Wayfaring of Merchants
 Eight Chapter: The Wayfaring of Tradesmen and Craftsmen

Other works
 His most famous was Merṣād al-'ebād men al-mabdā' elā'l-ma'ād or The Path of God's Bondsmen: From Origin to Return.
 Marmūzāt-e Asadī dar mazmūrāt-e Dā'ūdī or The Symbolic Expressions of Asadī Concerning the Psalms of David. Also known as the "special edition" of the Merṣād because it includes much of the same material while diminishing the strictly Sufi portion and expanding the section on kingly power.
 Dāya's own Arabic version of the Merṣād, Manārāt al-sā'erin elām'llāh wa maqāmāt al-ṭā'erīn be 'llāh or Light Towers for Those Voyaging to God. and the Stations of Those Plying with God.
 Tafsīr al-Ta'wīlāt al-najmīya, '''Ayn al-ḥayāt, or Baḥr al-ḥaqā'eq.
 A brief allegory in Persian called Resālat al-ṭoyūr or Treatise of the Birds.
 Me'yār al-ṣedq fī meṣdāq al-'ešq or The Criterion of Veracity Concerning the Touchstone of Love.

References

Sources
 Najmeddin Razi, Merṣād al-ʻebād men al-mabdāʼ elāʼl-maʻād, Edited by Mohammad-Amin Riahi, (first published by Bongahe Tarjome va Nashre Ketab), Tehran, 1973
 Daya, Naim-al-Din in Encyclopædia Iranica by Mohammad-Amin Riahi 
 E.G. Browne. Literary History of Persia. 1998. 
 Jan Rypka, History of Iranian Literature. Reidel Publishing Company. ASIN B-000-6BXVT-K

Further reading
 

1177 births
1247 deaths
People from Ray, Iran
13th-century Muslim scholars of Islam
Islamic philosophers
Iranian Sufis
Iranian philosophers
13th-century Persian-language writers
13th-century Persian-language poets
Persian spiritual writers
Sufi poets
Mystic poets
13th-century Iranian people
Iranian Muslim mystics